Argemone corymbosa, the Mojave prickly poppy, is a flowering plant in the family Papaveraceae native to the eastern Mojave Desert of the southwestern United States. It especially common around Cima, California and the nearby community of Kelso, California. The plant grows in sandy places and on dry slopes, and is very similar to desert prickly poppy.

Description
It is a perennial herbaceous plant growing to 40–80 cm tall, with distinctive orange latex in the stems. The leaves are 8–15 cm long, with prickly margins. The flowers are 4–8 cm diameter, with four white petals and an orange-colored center.

References

Jepson eFlora (TJM2) treatment of Argemone corymbosa 
Mojave Desert Wildflowers, Jon Mark Stewart, 1998, pg. 9

External links
   Calflora Database: Argemone corymbosa (Mohave prickly poppy)
 UC CalPhotos gallery of Argemone corymbosa

corymbosa
Endemic flora of California
Flora of the California desert regions
Natural history of the Mojave Desert
Mojave National Preserve
Flora without expected TNC conservation status